The Norwegian Settlers Memorial is the official memorial of the U.S. state of Illinois maintained in honor of immigrants from the nation of Norway. This Memorial commemorates the Fox River Settlement, the site of the first permanent Norwegian-American immigrant settlement in the Midwest. The Memorial is situated just south of the community of Norway in  LaSalle County, Illinois. It is located by the roadside of Illinois Route 71, 9 miles (14.5 km) northeast of Exit 93 on Interstate 80.

Description
The Memorial celebrates the first arrival in 1834 of a pioneering band of farm-seekers led by the peripatetic ethnic leader Cleng Peerson.  Peerson's vessel, the Restauration, is often credited with bringing the first group of immigrants from Norway to Kendall, New York in 1825. Scandinavian farm life had been devastated in 1816 by the Year Without a Summer, and younger sons and daughters from farm families in Norway were looking for new opportunities. During the 1840s, the Fox River Settlement frequently became a stopping-off point for Norwegian immigrants who entered America.  

The Memorial was dedicated in 1934 to commemorate the initial arrival in the Fox River Valley of the group led by Cleng Peerson.  At the time the Memorial was dedicated, many of the descendants of the Peerson party were still working the land their ancestors had taken up in 1834. Today the Memorial is an un-staffed historic site of the Illinois Historic Preservation Agency.

Three different plaques are located at the Norwegian Settlers Memorial. The  plaque dedicated in 1934 commemorates the arrival of the first group of Norwegian-American immigrants. The second and third plaques were dedicated in 1975 to commemorate the 150th Anniversary of Norwegian-American Immigration and to dedicate the adjacent Cleng Peerson Memorial Highway.  His Majesty King Olav V of Norway dedicated the Cleng Peerson plaque on October 17, 1975.

See also
Bishop Hill, Illinois - Pioneer settlement in Northern Illinois by immigrants from Sweden; Peerson moved here after leaving Norway, Illinois
Cranfills Gap, Texas - Peerson's final American home
Kendall, New York -  Site of a settlement of Norwegian immigrants established by Peerson in 1825

References

External links
Norwegian Settlements in the United States
The Fox River Settlement Revisited

Related Reading
Anderson, Rasmus B. (1895) The First Chapter of Norwegian Immigration (1821-1840); Its Causes and Results (Madison, Wisconsin: R.B. Anderson)
Blegen, Theodore C.  Norwegian Migration to America, 1825-1860 (Northfield, MN: The Norwegian-American Historic Association)
Holand, Hjalmar R. (1908) History Of The Norwegian Settlements; A General Survey Of Norwegian Immigration To America's Northwest And To Its Settlement (Ephraim, Wisconsin)
O'Byron, Michael Cyprian  (1924) History of LaSalle County, Illinois (Chicago: Lewis Pullishing Company)

Buildings and structures in LaSalle County, Illinois
Illinois State Historic Sites
Monuments and memorials in Illinois
Norwegian-American culture in Illinois
Norwegian migration to North America
Tourist attractions in LaSalle County, Illinois